Killeeshil is a townland (of 521 acres) and civil parish in County Tyrone, Northern Ireland. It is situated in the historic barony of Dungannon Lower.

The Parish contains the following 23 townlands:

 

A
Aghaginduff, Aghnahoe

B
Ballynahaye, Bockets

C
Cabragh, Clontyclevin, Clontyfallow, Coolhill, Cranlome, Cullentra

D
Dergenagh, Drumfad

E
Ennish, Eskragh

F
Farriter, Fasglashagh

G
Glencull

K
Killeeshil

L
Lisfearty, Lurgacullion

M
Mullyroddan, Mullysilly, Mulnahunch

See also
List of civil parishes of County Tyrone
List of townlands in County Tyrone

References

 
Townlands of County Tyrone